Manganoeudialyte is an moderately rare mineral of the eudialyte group, with formula Na14Ca6Mn3Zr3Si2[Si24O72(OH)2]Cl2·4H2O. The formula given is one of the forms that can be given, based on the originally reported one, and shows dominance of silicon at both the M3 and M4 sites. As suggested by its name, it is the manganese-analogue of eudialyte.

Occurrence and association
Manganoeudialyte was discovered in khibinites of the Poços de Caldas massif, Brazil. Associated minerals are aegirine, analcime, astrophyllite, cancrinite, fluorite, lamprophyllite, nepheline, potassium feldspar, rinkite, sodalite, and titanite.

Notes on chemistry
Impurities in manganoeudialyte include strontium, potassium, niobium, aluminium, fluorine, and minor hafnium, cerium, and lanthanum.

References

External links
 The Nomenclature of the Eudialyte-group minerals

Cyclosilicates
Sodium minerals
Calcium minerals
Manganese(II) minerals
Zirconium minerals
Trigonal minerals
Minerals in space group 160